is a Japanese weekday morning talk program airing on NHK General Television, hosted by Naoko Suzuki and Hanamaru-Daikichi Hakata. It airs weekdays from 8:15a.m.JST to 9:54a.m.JST.

History 

Asaichi started on March 29, 2010, evolving from NHK General Television's original morning information program Seikatsu Hot Morning. Yumiko Udo, the-then NHK Announcer, and Yoshihiko Inohara, a member of V6, one of Japan's popular pop groups, hosted this program from the first run.

Targeting mainly women in their 40s, this program dealt with a wide variety of themes, from information about health and money, cooking tips, and living improvement tips, to infertility problems, menopausal disorders, and the problem of sexless relationships.

In April 2018, Hanamaru-Daikichi Hakata and Yurie Omi took over the job of the main presenters from Udo and Inohara.

On February 10, 2021, NHK announced that Omi would be stepping down from the main presenter at the end of March because she would be leaving NHK, and handing over her job to NHK Announcer Naoko Suzuki.

On March 30, 2021, Naoko Suzuki started her anchor job.

Format 
As this program begins just after Renzoku Terebi Shōsetsu aired from 8:00a.m. to 8:15a.m.JST, it begins with a few minutes' comments related to the drama by the presenters.

This program is divided into two sections: the first section is from 8:15a.m. to 9:00a.m.JST, and the second one from 9:05a.m. to 9:54a.m.JST. Between these sections, news headlines air from NHK's News Center. If there is breaking news during the program, it is temporarily suspended for the News Center to broadcast the news.

Fax and email are available for viewers' real-time comments or opinions when the program is on air. Some of them are read out by the anchors during the program.

Recurring segments
In "Imaoshi! Live," Daichi Miyazaki visits a town in Japan where he reports what is hot in the town.
"Minna! Gohandayo" is a segment by Hanamaru Hakata and Tae Komamura having advice on everyday cooking from a top-notch chef or a cooking specialist. On Fridays, it is replaced by "Green Style dayo", which is a segment by Hanamaru-Daikichi Hakata and Komamura featuring gardening tips, or "Wagamama Hobby," which features home decor.
"Tsui-Q Rakuwaza" is a segment aired on Tuesdays in which Jun Soejima gives a quiz to presenters to inform them of life improvement tips.
"JapaNavi" is a segment on Thursdays in which correspondents offer gourmet or other useful information from a specific place nationwide. 
"Premium Talk" is Friday's particular segment, in which the anchors have an interview with celebrities, artists, and top-notch people in the entertainment field.

Personalities

Anchors
Naoko Suzuki, co-host
Hanamaru Hakata, co-host
Daikichi Hakata, co-host

Regular contributors
Tae Komamura, sub-host
Noriko Baba, presenter
Noriko Kamijo, correspondent
Hanako Mori, correspondent
Anna Nakagawa, correspondent
Takahiro Ishii, correspondent
Osamu Asai, correspondent
Takashi Kobayashi, correspondent
Akinobu Shinoyama, correspondent
Yasuhisa Furuhara, correspondent
Daishin Mikami, correspondent
Tomoyuki Yazaki, correspondent
Jun Soejima, "Quiz Tokumori" contributor
Daichi Miyazaki, "Imaoshi! Live" contributor

Notable former hosts
Yumiko Udo, co-host from March 2010 to March 2018, replaced by Yurie Omi.
Yoshihiko Inohara, co-host from March 2010 to March 2018, replaced by Hanamaru-Daikichi Hakata
Hideo Yanagisawa, co-host from March 2010 to March 2018
Yu Uozumi, correspondent from April 2018 to March 2019
Moeka Amemiya, correspondent from March 2016 to March 2019
Minori Chiba, correspondent from April 2018 to November 2019, replaced by Sayuri Hori
Naoyuki Tamura, correspondent from April 2018 to March 2020, replaced by Takahiro Ishii
Naoko Hashimoto, correspondent from June 2019 to March 2020, replaced by Anna Nakagawa
Yurie Omi, co-host from April 2018 to March 2021, replaced by Naoko Suzuki.
Yohei Morita, correspondent from April 2018 to March 2021, replaced by Osamu Asai
Tadayuki Matsuoka, correspondent from April 2019 to March 2021, replaced by Noriko Kamijo
Kaoru Fujiwara, "Odekake Live" contributor from March 2017 to March 2021, replaced by Tomoyuki Yazaki
Sayuri Hori, correspondent from April 2020 to March 2021, replaced by Hanako Mori

See also
Kōhaku Uta Gassen
Asadora

References

External links 

2010 Japanese television series debuts
2010s Japanese television series
2020s Japanese television series
NHK original programming
Japanese-language television shows
Live television series
Breakfast television